This is the discography of Cantopop artist Nicholas Tse. Tse has released over 30 CDs in his career since 1997, and some of his albums have a trend of releasing second editions, including the Me, and Release (釋放) album.

EP's
1997 無聲仿有聲
1998 末世紀的呼聲

Cantonese albums
1997 My Attitude (Rank 3rd in IFPI most selling CD)
1998 Horizons 
1999 Believe 
2000 零距離
2000 活著VIVA
2001 謝霆鋒創作紀念大碟Senses
2001 Jade Butterfly (玉蝴蝶)
2002 ME
2003 Reborn
2005 One Inch Closer

Mandarin albums
1999 謝謝你的愛1999 
2000 了解
2001 世紀預言 The Prophecy
2004 Listen Up
2005 Release (釋放)
2009 Last of Nicholas Tse （最后）

Compilations
1999 Most Wanted 
2000 20 Twenty - Best Selection by Nicholas Tse
2002 無形的他Invisible
2003 Most Wanted霆鋒精選 (DSD) 
2005 Yellow (黃)
2006 Forget Me Not (毋忘我)

Live albums
1999 紅人館903狂人熱份子音樂會 
2000 Viva Live謝霆鋒演唱會
2002 新城主力唱好霆鋒弦燒音樂Live
2002 唱好霆鋒弦燒音樂會
2004 Reborn Live - Beijing Concert (Reborn Live演唱會 北京站)
2005 Nicholas Tse x Tat Ming Pair Fantasy Concert (謝霆鋒 x 達明一派 新城同場異夢音樂會)

Other
2001 音樂世界 (MiniDisc) 
2004 英皇鋼琴熱戀系列

Singles
 2005 - "黃" - CD single released: 25 August and digital download from 23 August.
因為愛所以愛 Because of Love, I love
非走不可 (Have to Leave)
遊樂場" (Playground)
無聲仿有聲" (Sound in forms of mute)
狼 Wolf
塞车Traffic Jam

Tse, Nicholas
Pop music discographies